Belqas is a town located in the north-western corner of the Dakahlia Governorate in Egypt.

Etymology 
It is also a site of the old Coptic monastery called Deir al-Mema or Deir al-Askar.

Economy
One part of the town's economy is the resort of Gamasa. The town also depends on its natural gas fields in the region of Abu Mady. Belqas remains a mainly agricultural region, although it contains some industrial activities such as sugar, rice and plastic productions.

Belqas also depends on its car maintenance and restoration facility, restoring vehicles to factory standards (especially for the Peugot and Mercedes Benz).

Location
Belqas is located near the city of Mansoura and the town of Gamasa. Belqas is in the governorates of Dakahlia and Kafr el-Sheikh, and is located in the center of Sherbin, Garaida, Talkha and Gamasa. Belqas is located on the coordinates .

Sites of interest
Belqas is home to ancient palaces and villas which were once owned by princes and merchants. One of these tourist attractions in the jurisdictions of Belqas is the Coptic Orthodox monastery of Saint Demiana.

See also

 List of cities and towns in Egypt

References

Populated places in Dakahlia Governorate